The Midsayap–Marbel Road, also known as Makar–Dulawan–Midsayap–Marbel Road is a 101-kilometer (63 mi), two-to-four lane highway that connects the provinces of North Cotabato, Maguindanao, Sultan Kudarat, and South Cotabato. It is classified as a national secondary highway for Mindanao. It lessens the travel time from North Cotabato to South Cotabato and Sultan Kudarat via Midsayap.

The highway forms part of National Route 940 (N940) of the Philippine highway network.

Route description

Midsayap to Datu Saudi Ampatuan 
The northern section of N940 is at Midsayap that links to N75. At Datu Saudi Ampatuan, it links to an unnamed secondary highway which is the Salbu-Pagatin Highway.

Datu Saudi Ampatuan to Tacurong 
The N940 links Datu Saudi Ampatuan to other municipalities in Maguindanao. It traverses Mamasapano, Rajah Buayan, and Sultan sa Barongis. The bridge that links Maguindanao and Sultan Kudarat is the Pinguiaman Bridge.

Tacurong to Koronadal 
At Tacurong, there is a roundabout that links with N76. It traverses the municipality of Tantangan in South Cotabato.

References 

Roads in Cotabato
Roads in Maguindanao del Sur
Roads in Sultan Kudarat
Roads in South Cotabato